Rauzan was built as the British fishing trawler Earl Hereford. Sold to the Faroe Islands in 1912, she was purchased by the French Navy in 1917, serving as the patrol boat Guénon. She was sold in 1919 and was renamed Pen-er-Vro. Renamed Rauzan by 1930, she was requisitioned by the Kriegsmarine during the Second World War for use as a vorpostenboot, serving as V 421 Rauzan. She was sunk in June 1944.

Description
The engine was made by C. D. Holmes & Son Ltd., Hull, Yorkshire, United Kingdom. It was rated at 71nhp. The engine powered a single screw propeller.

History
Earl Hereford was built as yard number 110 by Cook, Welton and Gemmell, Beverley, Yorkshire for the Earl Steam Fishing Co. Ltd., Grimsby, Lincolnshire. She was launced on 10 April 1906 and completed in June. The fishing boat registration GY 147 and United Kingdom Official Number 123569 were allocated. The Code Letters HGMQ were allocated and she was operated under the management of A. L. Black. In December 1912, she was sold to Christian M. Eversen, Thorshavn, Faroe Islands. The Code Letters KBWC were allocated. In 1917, Earl Hereford was purchased by the French Navy for use as an auxiliary patrol vessel. She was renamed Guénon.

In 1919, she was sold to F. Evan, Lorient, Morbihan and was renamed Pen-er-Vro. The fishing boat registration L 1965 was allocated, as were the Code Letters OQHY. She had been renamed Rauzan by 1930. In 1933, she was sold to L. Ballas, Lorient. Her Code Letters were changed to FOXA in 1934.

On 20 May 1942, Rauzan was seized by the Kriegsmarine. On 1 October, she was commissioned as a vorpostenboot and allocated to 4 Vorpostenflotille, serving as V 421 Rauzan.  She was lost on 4 June 1944, during Operation Neptune. 4 Vorpostenflotille was operating out of Boulogne, Pas-de-Calais, France on that day. Its orders were to carry out a reconnaissance patrol from Boulogne in a westerly direction. V 421 Rauzan was decommissioned on 22 August 1944.

References

Sources

1906 ships
Ships built on the Humber
Steamships of the United Kingdom
Fishing vessels of the United Kingdom
Steamships of Denmark
Merchant ships of Denmark
World War I merchant ships of Denmark
Steamships of France
Auxiliary ships of the French Navy
World War I patrol vessels of France
Patrol vessels of France
Merchant ships of France
World War II merchant ships of France
Auxiliary ships of the Kriegsmarine
Steamships of Germany
Maritime incidents in June 1944
World War II shipwrecks in the English Channel